Nadigan is a 1990 Indian Tamil-language comedy thriller film written directed by P. Vasu. A remake of the Hindi film Professor (1962), it stars Sathyaraj and Khushbu. The film was released on 30 November 1990 and became a success, winning four Tamil Nadu State Film Awards.

Plot 

Raja's mother requires a major operation to be done. However, due to poverty, Raja decides to look for a job in Ooty. While travelling on a train with his mother to Ooty, he meets Devaraj, who is actually a music teacher travelling to island estate – Ooty for a  monthly waged job. He carries with him a recommendation letter with a contact address. while alighting, the suitcases which resembles the same of Raja and Devaraj, interchange. So by mistake, Raja takes away the suitcase. When reaching their room, he finds the letter, and due to the critical situation of his mother, he decides to take the job. So he joins the job, first changing himself as an old man by sticking a beard and white hair. There, he finds Baby Amma, the guardian of two young women and two children. He is put in to look after them as a guardian and teacher. Meanwhile, Raja's mother is in critical condition. What transpires form the crux of the story.

Cast 

Sathyaraj as Raja
Khushbu as Geetha
Manorama as Anandha Karpagavalli 
Goundamani as Kurangu Kannayiram
Vennira Aadai Moorthy as Devaraj
Prathapachandran
Kundara Johny
Chinni Jayanth as Chinni
Oru Viral Krishna Rao as Policeman
Pandu as Pandu
Ramu
Thalapathy Dinesh
Sakthi Vasu (child artist) Prashanth
Natasha Ali
Balambiga
Karikalan

Production 
Nadigan is a remake of the Hindi film Professor (1962). Although the story is set primarily in Ooty, the film was shot in Kodaikanal.

Soundtrack 
The soundtrack was composed by Ilaiyaraaja.

Release and reception 
Nadigan was released on 30 November 1990. N. Krishnaswamy of The Indian Express praised Sathyaraj's acting and Ashok Kumar's cinematography. C. R. K. of Kalki praised the film's humour, music and cinematography. The film was a success, running for over 100 days in theatres. It won the Tamil Nadu State Film Awards for Best Dialogue Writer (Vasu), Special Award for Best Actor (Sathyaraj), Best Art Director (Salam) and Best Stunt Director (Vikram Dharma).

References

External links 
 

1990 films
1990s comedy mystery films
1990s comedy thriller films
1990s mystery thriller films
1990s Tamil-language films
Films directed by P. Vasu
Films scored by Ilaiyaraaja
Films shot in Ooty
Indian comedy mystery films
Indian comedy thriller films
Indian mystery thriller films
Tamil remakes of Hindi films